Aml Eysan Ameen (born 30 July 1985) is a British actor and filmmaker. He is best known for his roles as Trevor (Trife) in Kidulthood (2006), Lewis Hardy in the ITV television series The Bill, Capheus in the first season of the Netflix original series Sense8, and Alby in The Maze Runner (2014).

Early life
Ameen was born in London, England, to Jamaican and Vincentian parents. He studied acting at the Barbara Speake Stage School, an independent school in London. As a child he appeared in the West End in shows such as Oliver! and Jolson. At the age of 11, he performed on stage with Michael Jackson at the 1996 BRIT Awards in a performance famously invaded by Pulp's singer Jarvis Cocker.

Career

2002–2011
Ameen's first acting role came in 2002 ITV police series The Bill, and he made another guest stint in 2004 before joining the series full-time in 2006 as PC Lewis Hardy, his most famous and popular role to date. Lewis Hardy is a headstrong character who has swapped his life as a street kid to try to make a difference on the right side of the law. He has a few problems with authority and regularly bumps heads with his seniors, most especially frequent beat partner PC Roger Valentine. After Hardy was put undercover and was shot, he was transferred to Operation Trident.

Soon after his guest appearance on The Bill in 2004, he portrayed the character Terry in Bella and the Boys, He also made one-off guest appearances in BBC soap EastEnders and medical drama Holby City. He also starred in the British youth-centred film Kidulthood as the central character Trife, while he also appeared in Second Chance and Red Tails for a special appearance.

In April 2008, he played a leading role in the BBC Three teen drama Dis/Connected, playing Anthony, an 18-year-old college student from London who faces gang trouble on the streets, as well as losing his friend when she commits suicide.

Ameen featured in a film on Channel 4 called Fallout, part of their Disarming Britain mini-season. The London Lite paper described this as his most memorable performance. He featured as AJ in Silent Witness Series 12 Parts 1 and 2. He portrayed a youth worker trying to make a difference in the gang and knife community which presides in South London, and became friends with Leo, one of the senior pathologists doing community service for drunk driving.

In June 2008, Ameen began Actors Student Alliance, a drama school set up to discover and teach untapped talent in London. From its inception, the school produced a short film and a theatre showcase for its students. Within its second year, the school expanded into a management company.

Ameen performed at the Tricycle Theatre on the "Not Black and White" season in October 2009. Described as "exceptionally charismatic Aml Ameen the freshest, most inspiring voice in the play" by Time Out London, he received outstanding reviews in the national press. Ameen starred in Jason Barrett's British feature film The Naked Poet, in which he played character Ryan. For this performance, he won Best Actor at the VIPF Awards in 2010.

Ameen also starred in David E. Kelley's legal drama Harry's Law in the first season, which began to air on NBC during the 2011 television season.

2012–2018
Ameen's first Hollywood film role is in George Lucas's Red Tails (2012), about the African American Tuskegee airman in World War II. He played Alby in the 2014 film adaptation of the young adult, science-fiction, dystopian novel, The Maze Runner.

In 2015, Ameen was one of the eight central characters in the initial run of the Netflix series Sense8, produced by the Wachowskis and J. Michael Straczynski. However, conflicts with Lana Wachowski resulted in his "abrupt" firing and replacement with Toby Onwumere after filming two episodes of the second season in 2016.

In 2018, Ameen starred as a young Jamaican named "D" in the film Yardie. The film was based on Victor Headley's 1992 cult novel of the same name. Actor Idris Elba made his directorial debut with the film in London and Jamaica.

2020–present
Ameen's own debut as a director was announced in November 2020. Boxing Day was released on 3 December 2021 and, as the writer, Ameen used elements from his own life, "I kind of draw from inspiration from different moments in my family [..] my parents got divorced when I was 15, not when I was 28, so I just kind of reconstructed everything a little bit to suit the film and to suit the dramatic purposes. But a lot of the characters [...] are based on my real sister, my real father." The film stars Ameen, Aja Naomi King, Leigh-Anne Pinnock (in her film debut), Marianne Jean-Baptiste, Stephen Dillane and Martina Laird. Boxing Day received mixed reviews.
He also played the role of the narrator Tom in the podcast The Left Right Game.

In addition to his theatrical work Ameen has used his voice to shed light on issues within the industry. In 2022, he featured in a BBC radio 4  documentary My name Is Ricardo P Lloyd.

Recognition
He was named one of The Times newspaper's "Ones To Watch" for 2006, and won "Best actor in a TV performance" at the 2007 Screen Nation Awards. Additionally, he presented an award at the Mobo Awards 2006.

Filmography

Film

Television

References

External links
 

1985 births
English people of Jamaican descent
English people of Saint Vincent and the Grenadines descent
Black British male actors
English male child actors
English male television actors
21st-century English male actors
English male film actors
Male actors from London
Living people